, is a sub-kilometer asteroid and near-Earth object of the Amor group, that is on a low-eccentricity and low-inclination orbit between the orbits of Earth and Mars. It was discovered by the Spacewatch survey at Kitt Peak National Observatory on 22 May 1998.

Description 

 is an Amor asteroid, because its perihelion is less than 1.3 AU and does not cross Earth's orbit. The asteroid measures approximately 100–240 meters in diameter.

Its orbit is within a region of stability where bodies may survive for the age of the Solar System, and hence it may have formed near its current orbit.

Between 1900 and 2200 its closest approach to Earth is more than 0.12 AU.

See also

References

External links 
 
 
 

350462
350462
350462
19980522